Flowery Gully is a locality and small rural community in the local government area of West Tamar, in the Western Tamar Valley region of Tasmania. The 2016 census determined a population of 87 for the state suburb of Flowery Gully.

Road infrastructure
The C717 route (Flowery Gully Road) runs west from the West Tamar Highway and passes through the locality from south to north before returning to the highway.

References

Localities of West Tamar Council
Towns in Tasmania